"Seoul" is the second release from the Icelandic quartet Amiina. It is also the first single from their first album, Kurr. It was self-released on 6 November 2006 in Europe and released by The Worker's Institute on 7 November 2006 in the USA. In January 2007, it was made available on iTunes by the Danish label Rumraket.

The 12" vinyl EP is limited and hand numbered to 1000 copies and contains a bonus track in the form of "Seoul" remixed by Frakkur (Sigur Rós' Jón Þór Birgisson's artist name when releasing solo material). Kjartan Sveinsson, also from Sigur Rós, as well as Birgir Jón Birgisson participated in the mastering of the single at Sundlaugin studio.

Track listing
 "Seoul" – 7:01
 "Ugla" – 3:59
 "Ammælis" – 2:57
 "Óróamix" – 4:47 (Seoul Remix by Frakkur, bonus track on 12" vinyl)

2006 singles